Yogesh Kundalik Tilekar is an Indian politician and member of the Bharatiya Janata Party. Tilekar was Corporator in Pune Municipal Corporation (PMC) and was first term member of the Maharashtra Legislative Assembly in 2014 from the  Hadapsar constituency assembly in Pune. He was also the President of Bhartiya Janata Yuva Morcha (BJYM) Maharashtra State for 5 years. Presently he is the President of Bhartiya Janata Party OBC Morcha.

References 

Politicians from Pune
Bharatiya Janata Party politicians from Maharashtra
Maharashtra MLAs 2014–2019
Living people
Marathi politicians
Year of birth missing (living people)